Just Dance 2018 is a 2017 dance rhythm game developed and published by Ubisoft. It was unveiled on June 12, 2017, during its E3 press conference as the ninth main installment of the series, and was released in October 2017 for PlayStation 3, PlayStation 4, Xbox 360, Xbox One, Wii, Wii U, and Nintendo Switch.

This was the last Just Dance game released on the PlayStation 3 console, and by extension, the final PlayStation 3 video game to be published by Ubisoft. All online services for every year-titled Just Dance game prior to Just Dance 2019 on seventh-generation consoles, as well as Just Dance 2014 and Just Dance 2015 on eighth-generation consoles, were discontinued on November 19, 2018.

Gameplay

As with the previous installments of the franchise, players must mimic the on-screen dancer's choreography to a chosen song using either motion controllers or the game's associated Just Dance Controller app on a smartphone.

While the Wii, PS3, and Xbox 360 versions of the game are based on Just Dance 2015, the current-generation console versions' user interface was redesigned, which removed other additional modes except for the "World Dance Floor" to more focus on standard gameplay. In the "Just Dance" mode menu, players can activate Sweat by pressing a certain button on the controller. A new "Super" judgment was added between "Good" and "Perfect", as well as a "Megastar" rank, achievable at 12,000 points. The new "Dance Lab" mode features medleys of choreography representing different professions and animals, while a new "Kids Mode" was designed to provide a gameplay experience and choreography tailored towards younger players, with rainbow stars as the max rank, as akin to the "Superstar" rank in the main "Just Dance" mode.

The "World Dance Floor" mode has a revamped Team Battle feature, which players are randomly assigned to either the Red Team or the Blue Team, as well as seasonal rankings.

The Nintendo Switch version of the game features a new "Double Rumble" mode, which features routines based on different professions that leverage the "HD Rumble" functionality in the console's Joy-Con controllers to provide feedback.

The Ubisoft Connect feature was removed in the PS3, and Xbox 360 versions of the game. Furthermore, the Community Remix and Mashup features were also removed.

All online services for the Wii, PS3, and Xbox 360 versions of the game were discontinued on November 19, 2018.

Soundtrack
The following songs appear on Just Dance 2018:

Kids Mode
The following songs appear on the Kids Mode of the game:

Note: These songs also can be played on 7th-gen consoles (Wii, Xbox 360 and PlayStation 3).

Just Dance Unlimited
Just Dance Unlimited is a subscription-based service for accessing a streaming library of songs from previous Just Dance games, and new songs that are exclusive to the service. A three-month subscription to Just Dance Unlimited is included as part of the game. All exclusive tracks (except tracks restricted to only 2018) are also playable on 2016 and 2017s Unlimited service. The 2018 game supports Just Dance Unlimited on PlayStation 4, Xbox One, Wii U, and Nintendo Switch.

Songs exclusive to Just Dance Unlimited include:

Reception

Accolades
The game was nominated for "Best Family/Social Game" at the 2017 Game Critics Awards. In Game Informers Reader's Choice Best of 2017 Awards, it took the lead for "Best Music/Rhythm Game". It was also nominated for "Family Game of the Year" at the 21st Annual D.I.C.E. Awards, and for "Family Game" at the 14th British Academy Games Awards. It won the award for "Favorite Video Game" at Nickelodeon's 2018 Kids' Choice Awards, and was nominated for "Fan-Favorite Multiplayer Game" at the Gamers' Choice Awards.

References

External links

Dance video games
Fitness games
Just Dance (video game series)
Kinect games
Music video games
Nintendo Network games
Nintendo Switch games
PlayStation 3 games
PlayStation 4 games
PlayStation Move-compatible games
2017 video games
Ubisoft games
Wii games
Wii U eShop games
Wii U games
Xbox 360 games
Xbox One games